Park Jong-woo (born 10 March 1989) is a South Korean football player, who currently plays for Busan IPark as a midfielder. He has previously played for the Chinese club Guangzhou R&F and also in the UAE Arabian Gulf League for Al Jazira and Emirates. He has represented South Korea at age group and senior level, including the Men's tournament at the 2012 Summer Olympics, and was part of the South Korean squad for 2014 FIFA World Cup in Brazil.

Club career 
Park joined Busan IPark from Yonsei University for the 2010 K-League season. Park's first appearance for his new club was in the K League 1, as a substitute in the 3–0 win over FC Seoul on 2 May 2010. Since his debut, Park has established himself as a Busan regular, making several appearances in both 2010 and 2011. Park scored his first professional goal in a drawn match with the Chunnam Dragons on 21 August 2011.

Park enjoyed a personally successful 2012 season, in which he became a key figure for Busan I'Park in central midfield. His performances ensured his inclusion in the South Korea squad for the London Olympics that summer.

Park continued his good form into 2013. On the opening day of the K League 1 season, during a 2–2 draw with Gangwon, he assisted Lim Sang-hyub's's opening goal, and later converted a penalty. On 7 August, Park scored the deciding goal, also from the penalty spot, in the 2–1 victory over FC Seoul in the quarter final of the FA Cup, taking Busan into the semi finals. Park was included in the official K League 1 Team of the Week on six occasions during the 2013 season.

On 13 February 2014, Park transferred to Chinese Super League side Guangzhou R&F. After a year and a half with the Chinese club, Park transferred to Al Jazira on 6 July 2015, on a three-year contract. He was a regular member of the team that were crowned champions of the 2016/17 Arabian Gulf League.

After one season with Emirates Club in the UAE Arabian Gulf League, Park transferred to Korean side Suwon Bluewings for the second half of the 2018 Korean season.

On 12 January 2019 Park signed for Busan IPark, the club at which he began his professional career. Park was named Busan vice-captain for the 2019 season and was a regular starter as the club finished second in the league and achieved promotion to the K League 1. He contributed seven assists and was shortlisted for the K League 2 Bext XI. Park was named club captain for the 2021 season.

International career 
Park was included in the South Korean squad for the 2012 London Olympics. He started all three group games as South Korea finished second in their group and advanced to the next round. In the quarter final match with Great Britain, Park played the entire 120 minutes as the game went to a penalty shoot-out. Park scored the fourth penalty for Korea, who won the shoot-out 5–4. Park was an unused substitute in the semi final defeat to Brazil, but returned to the starting line-up for the third place play-off victory over Japan, which ensured Korea were bronze medal winners.

After impressing as a midfield partner for Ki Sung-yueng at the Olympic Games, Park made his full international debut on 17 October 2012 in a World Cup qualifying defeat to Iran. He represented Korea in the 2013 East Asian Cup, and was also part of the squad for the 2014 FIFA World Cup in Brazil. He was an unused substitute in all three group games as Korea were eliminated at the group stage.

Park returned to the national team squad after a three-year absence for the friendly games against Russia and Morocco in October 2017.

London Olympics controversy 
As a consequence he was banned from the medal ceremony and unlike his other 17 teammates he did not receive a bronze medal for his performance. It was also announced that he was under investigation by the International Olympic Committee and football's governing body FIFA, both of which have rules that prohibit political statements by athletes on the field.

South Korea exempts Olympic medalists from military service. Despite Park not receiving a medal due to his political statement South Korean sports minister Choe Kwang-shik stated that regardless of what the IOC investigation decides Park will still not be required to do the two years of military service that South Korean men are required to do.
FIFA failed to reach a conclusion on the case at a meeting at its Zurich headquarters held on 5 October, and the disciplinary committee discussed the case again on the following week, then failed to reach a verdict again.

After that, the Korean Olympic Committee (KOC) announced that Park would receive his bronze medal.

However, the case was heard again by the committee on 20 November, and FIFA finally decided and announced on 3 December to suspend Park for two matches after he was considered to have breached the FIFA Disciplinary Code and the Regulations of the Olympic Football Tournaments. FIFA also impose a warning on the Korea Football Association and reminded it of its obligation to properly instruct its players on all the pertinent rules and applicable regulations before the start of any competition, in order to avoid such incident in the future. The Korea Football Association was warned that should incidents of such nature occur again in the future, the FIFA Disciplinary Committee may impose harsher sanctions on the Korea Football Association.

On 11 February 2013, Park attended an International Olympic Committee disciplinary hearing at Lausanne, Switzerland. After the Disciplinary Commission reviewed Park's action at the Olympics, the IOC decided to give the player the medal he had been barred from collecting for several months. Park was subsequently awarded his Olympic bronze medal, following a ruling by the International Olympic Committee over his celebration at the London Olympic Games.

Club career statistics
Updated 17 October 2022

References

External links

1989 births
Living people
People from Seongnam
Anti-Japanese sentiment in Korea
Association football midfielders
South Korean footballers
South Korea international footballers
Busan IPark players
Guangzhou City F.C. players
Al Jazira Club players
Emirates Club players
K League 1 players
K League 2 players
Chinese Super League players
2014 FIFA World Cup players
Footballers at the 2012 Summer Olympics
Olympic footballers of South Korea
Olympic medalists in football
Olympic bronze medalists for South Korea
Yonsei University alumni
Medalists at the 2012 Summer Olympics
South Korean expatriate sportspeople in China
Expatriate footballers in China
South Korean expatriate sportspeople in the United Arab Emirates
Expatriate footballers in the United Arab Emirates
UAE Pro League players
Sportspeople from Gyeonggi Province